Griffon is a type of dog, a collection of breeds that were originally hunting dogs. There are three lines of the griffon type recognized by the Fédération Cynologique Internationale (FCI): the Griffon Vendéens, the wirehaired pointers, and the smousje (Belgian companion dogs or Dutch Smoushond). The griffon type is characterized by rough- or wire-hair.

The griffon is mentioned as early as Xenophon. The hounds, Canis Segusius, used by the Gauls were griffons. Among the oldest breeds are the Italian Wirehaired Pointing Dog or Spinone Italiano (FCI #165) and the breeds bred by Eduard Karel Korthals originating in the Low Countries (Belgium, Netherlands, northern France) which have a short, bearded muzzle. The smousje, a small dog mentioned since the Middle Ages in the Low Countries known for its firm, even temperament and rough coat, was the initial breeding stock for the Brussels Griffon.

Griffon breeds

Scenthounds
Scenthounds (FCI Group 6, Section 1)
 large size, long hair
Grand Griffon Vendéen
 medium size, coarse hair
Briquet Griffon Vendéen
Griffon Bleu de Gascogne 
Griffon Fauve de Bretagne 
Griffon Nivernais
small size
Grand Basset Griffon Vendéen
Petit Basset Griffon Vendéen
Basset Fauve de Bretagne

Pointers
Pointers (FCI Group 7, Section 1)
Spinone Italiano or Italian Griffon (FCI #165)
White-orange Spinone Italiano
Chestnut-roan Spinone Italiano
Wirehaired Pointing Griffon or Korthals Griffon or French Wirehaired Pointing Griffon (FCI #107)
Český Fousek or Bohemian Wirehaired Pointing Griffon (FCI #245)
Slovak Rough-haired Pointer or Slovakian Wiredhaired Pointer or Slovenský Ohař Hrubosrstý or Slovenský Hrubosrsty Stavac (Ohar) (FCI #320)
German Wirehaired Pointer or Deutsch Drahthaar (FCI #98)
Drótszőrű Magyar Vizsla or Wirehaired Vizsla or Hungarian Wirehaired Pointer (Vizsla) (FCI #239)
Stichelhaar or German Roughhaired Pointer

Companion/Toy Dogs
Small Belgian Companion Dogs, "Smousje" (FCI Group 9, Section 3)
Brussels Griffon or Griffon Bruxellois (FCI #80)
Belgian Griffon or Griffon Belge (FCI #81)
Brabancon Griffon or Petit Brabançon (FCI #82) - has a short smooth coat

See also
 Dogs portal
 List of dog breeds

Notes

External links
Fédération Cynologique Internationale World Canine Federation;

Dog types